The 2017–18 Rice Owls women's basketball team represents Rice University during the 2017–18 NCAA Division I women's basketball season. The Owls, led by third year head coach Tina Langley, play their home games at the Tudor Fieldhouse and are members of Conference USA. They finished the season 23–10, 10–6 in C-USA play to finish in a 4 way tie for third place. They advanced to the semifinals of the C-USA women's tournament where they lost to UAB. They revived an at-large bid to the Women's National Invitation Tournament where they defeated Texas State in the first round before losing to New Mexico in the second round.

Previous season
They finished the season 22–13, 8–10 in C-USA play to finish in a 3 way tie for eighth place. They advanced to the quarterfinals of the C-USA women's tournament where they lost to Middle Tennessee. They were invited to the WBI where they defeat Lamar, Texas–Rio Grande Valley, Idaho and UNC Greensboro to become champions of the Women's Basketball Invitational.

Roster

Schedule

|-
!colspan=9 style=| Non-conference regular season
|-

|-

|-

|-

|-

|-

|-

|-

|-

|-

|-

|-

|-
!colspan=9 style=| Conference USA regular season
|-

|-

|-

|-

|-

|-

|-

|-

|-

|-

|-

|-

|-

|-

|-

|-

|-
!colspan=9 style=|Conference USA Women's Tournament

|-
!colspan=9 style=|WNIT

See also
2017–18 Rice Owls men's basketball team

References

Rice Owls women's basketball seasons
Rice
Rice